Emmanuel Uwechue, known by his stage name Brother Hao is a Nigerian singer. He rose to fame through a performance with Han Hong on the CCTV New Year's Gala and has emerged as one of the most notable foreign singers in China.

Career
Uwechue began his singing career in the choir at Lagos' House on the Rock Pentecostal church in Nigeria. He received a degree in engineering, and began to pursue a singing career, which led his father to disown him. Before getting his career off the ground in China, he was a country music singer. In 2001, a friend of his, Li Yayu, started Uwechue's singing career in China by inviting him to perform in hotels and bars throughout Henan and Hubei. At the Big Easy Bar in Beijing, he was discovered by Liu Huan, a well-known music producer, who helped him learn Mandarin Chinese.

Discography
 Red and Black (2006)
 Hao Ge’s Latest Songs (2008)
 Beloved Life (2009)

See also

Lou Jing

References

External links
 on China Central Television

1981 births
Living people
Mandopop singers
Nigerian expatriates in China
Musicians from Lagos
21st-century Nigerian male singers
Maoists